History Compass is a peer-reviewed online-only academic journal published by Wiley-Blackwell. Originally launched in association with the Institute of Historical Research (London), it is unique in its purpose and structure, aiming to "solve the problem of keeping up with new developments in history by providing historians with regularly updated overviews of the important trends, debates, resources and publications in the field...combining a current awareness service with a survey journal for lecturers, researchers, and advanced students of history."

The journal commissions leading academics to write survey articles on "the most important research and thinking across the entire discipline, with no restrictions in terms of geography, time period or historical methodology." While authoritative, articles are also written in an engaging and lively style, as the journal's intended audience includes not just professional historians but also non-specialists and advanced undergraduate students. 

Launched in 2003, within three years it had become a leading high-profile peer reviewed electronic journal for history, featuring more than 100 new articles per year and its site routinely receiving 300,000 hits a month.

The journal is divided into ten geographical subsections, each of which has its own editor(s):

Africa
Toyin Falola, University of Texas at Austin
Elizabeth Thornberry, Johns Hopkins

Ancient World
Ari Bryen, West Virginia University

Asia
Dominic Sachsenmaier, Göttingen University
Projit B. Mukharji, University of Pennsylvania

Australasia & Pacific
Kate Darian-Smith, University of Tasmania
Katie Pickles, University of Canterbury
Paul Turnbull, University of Tasmania

Britain & Ireland
David S Bachrach, University of New Hampshire
Brian Lewis, McGill University
R. Malcolm Smuts, University of Massachusetts, Boston

Caribbean & Latin America
Robert Schwaller, University of Kansas
Jeff Shumway, Brigham Young University

Europe
Leighton James, Swansea University
Katherine French, University of Michigan
Daniel Stolzenberg, University of California, Davis

Middle & Near East
Justin Stearns, NYU Abu Dhabi
Shana Minkin, Sewanee, The University of the South

North America
Cecilia Morgan, University of Toronto
Daniel Livesay, Claremont McKenna College
Jennifer Wallach, University of North Texas

World
Rainer F. Buschmann, CSU Channel Islands 

The current editor-in-chief is historian Projit B. Mukharji, of the University of Pennsylvania (2018-present).

The founding editor-in-chief was the late Mark Kishlansky, of Harvard University (2003-2008), followed by Felice Lifshitz, of the University of Alberta (2008-2013); and Laura Smoller, of the University of Rochester (2013-2018). The journal has benefited from a close association with the American Historical Association, which for a time offered its members a free six-month trial. The journal also offered a now-defunct graduate essay prize, the results of which were to be announced at the AHA's annual meeting.

References

External links
Official site

History journals
Monthly journals
Wiley-Blackwell academic journals
English-language journals
Publications established in 2003
Online-only journals